In mathematics, a Nori semistable vector bundle is a particular type of vector bundle whose first definition has been first implicitly suggested by Madhav V. Nori, as one of the main ingredients for the construction of the fundamental group scheme. The original definition given by Nori was obviously not called Nori semistable. Also, Nori's definition was different from the one suggested nowadays. The category of Nori semistable vector bundles contains the Tannakian category of essentially finite vector bundles, whose naturally associated group scheme is the fundamental group scheme .

Definition

Difference with Nori's original definition
Nori semistable vector bundles were called by Nori semistable causing a lot of confusion with the already existing definition of semistable vector bundles. Then for instance in positive characteristic a morphism  like the Frobenius morphism was not included in Nori's original definition. The importance of including it is that the above definition makes the category of Nori semistable vector bundles tannakian and the group scheme associated to it is the -fundamental group scheme . Instead, Nori's original definition didn't give rise to a Tannakian category but only to an abelian category.

Notes

Scheme theory
Topological methods of algebraic geometry